David Messina (born 1974) is an Italian comics artist.

Early life
David Messina was born in 1974. He graduated from the Scuola Internazionale di Comics (International School of Comics) in Rome.

Career
David Messina did storyboarding and character design in the animation industry and also worked in graphic design before breaking into comics.
 
He has published erotic comics books for the Spanish, Italian and French markets. He broke into the American comics industry in 2005. He has done work for IDW Publishing, Marvel Comics, Image Comics, Devil's Due Publishing and DC Comics.

Since 2002 Messina has taught at his alma mater, the Scuola Internazionale di Comics in Rome, Italy.

Bibliography
Doyle: Spotlight
"Unacceptable Losses"
The Curse
Old Friends (Angel comic)
Star Trek: Countdown
Star Trek: Nero

Erotic comics
Sally Potter
The Big Pervert
The "X" Factor

References

External links

Italian comics artists
Italian erotic artists
Living people
1974 births